Leirvik may refer to:

Places
Leirvik, a town in Stord municipality, Vestland county, Norway
Leirvik, Alver, a village in Alver municipality, Vestland county, Norway
Leirvik, Finnmark, a village in Hammerfest municipality, Troms og Finnmark county, Norway
Leirvik, Hyllestad, a village in Hyllestad municipality, Vestland county, Norway
Leirvík, a village in Eystur municipality in the Faroe Islands

Other
Leirvík ÍF, a football club playing in Leirvík in the Faroe Islands

See also
 Lerwick, a burgh in the Shetland Islands, United Kingdom
 Lervik, a village in Fredrikstad municipality, Østfold county, Norway